Anne Pattrick (1881–1937) was a New Zealand Plunket nurse and nursing administrator. She was born in Christchurch, North Canterbury, New Zealand in 1881. She was director of nursing for Plunket, in charge of the Karitane hospitals from 1921.

References

1881 births
1937 deaths
People from Christchurch
New Zealand nurses
New Zealand women nurses
Plunket Society